La France Insoumise (FI or LFI; ; "France Unbowed") is a left-wing populist political party in France, launched in 2016 by Jean-Luc Mélenchon, then a Member of the European Parliament (MEP) and former co-president of the Left Party (PG). It aims to implement the eco-socialist and democratic socialist programme L'Avenir en commun.

The party nominated Mélenchon as its candidate for the presidential election of 2017. He came fourth in the first round, receiving 19.5% of the vote and failing to qualify for the second round by around 2%. After the legislative election of 2017, La France Insoumise formed a parliamentary group of 17 members of the National Assembly, with Mélenchon as the group's president. In the 2019 European Parliament election, it however only won six seats, below its expectations.

In 2022, Mélenchon again became the party's candidate for president, and later Christiane Taubira, winner of the People's Primary, endorsed Mélenchon. In the first round of 2022 French presidential election voting in April, Mélenchon came in third, garnering 7.7 million votes, narrowly behind second-place finisher Marine Le Pen.

The party uses the lower case Greek letter phi as its logotype.

History 
La France Insoumise was founded on 10 February 2016, based on the belief that traditional parties and political organisations no longer serve democracy and instead transverse movements are needed. The movement is particularly inspired by the Spanish party Podemos, the election of Jeremy Corbyn as Labour Party leader in the United Kingdom in 2015 and the candidacy of Bernie Sanders in the Democratic Party presidential primaries of 2016 in the United States.

Its first meeting took place in Place Stalingrad, Paris on 5 June 2016 in the form of a march numbering about 10,000 people, according to the organisers. A second meeting took place in the gardens of the Toulouse Observatory on 28 August 2016.

The programme L'Avenir en commun (English: "A Shared Future") was adopted during the Lille convention, attended by just under 1,000 people in Saint-André-lez-Lille on 15/16 October 2016. Several personalities addressed the convention, including former Société Générale trader Jérôme Kerviel, LuxLeaks whistleblower Antoine Deltour, political specialist Paul Ariès, former Malian Minister of Culture Aminata Traoré, and former Speaker of the Hellenic Parliament Zoe Konstantopoulou.

At this convention, the movement also presented twenty candidates for the French legislative election of June 2017, including Jean-Marie Brom, physicist, research director of the French National Center for Scientific Research (CNRS) and spokesperson of Sortir du nucléaire; Rémy Garnier, public finance inspector and whistleblower in the Cahuzac affair; Lionel Burriello, leader of the CGT union for the ArcelorMittal steel works in Florange; Mehdi Kémoune, deputy secretary-general of the CGT union for Air France; actress Sophie De La Rochefoucauld; Marie-Hélène Bourlard, trade unionist featured in the movie Merci patron!; Olivia Cattan, journalist and founder of the association SOS Autisme France; and Nathalie Seguin, trade unionist and member of the French Communist Party (PCF).

In August 2017, La France Insoumise organized its first summer university (called Les AmFIs, a play between the word amphitheater and the acronym FI for France insoumise), a traditional moment in France where campuses open their doors to political party gatherings and meetings between activists, elected officials, and many philosophical and cultural guests. It was set in the Marseille Saint-Charles University and comprised  four days of debates, conferences and workshops. The movement debated also about its future.

In the 2017 Corsican territorial election, local supporters of La France Insoumise under the banner of "La Corse Insoumise" were allied with the PCF. The PCF-FI alliance attacked Mélenchon and the list was disavowed by Mélenchon.

Ideology and political programme 
The drawing up of the programme was coordinated by economist Jacques Généreux and lawyer Charlotte Girard. It drew its inspiration from L'Humain d'abord (English: "Human First"), the programme of the Left Front during the 2012 presidential election, from work carried out by the PG during its conventions on eco-socialism and summits for a "plan B in Europe", and from contributions from supporters of the movement, which the rapporteurs were asked to synthesize.

At the end of the Lille Convention, a synthesis of all the proposals resulted in a programme of 7 axioms and 357 measures. It was adopted by more than 90% of voters.

The movement proposes "ten emblematic measures", approved during the Lille Convention, calling for four main "emergencies" to be addressed: the democratic emergency, the social emergency, the ecological emergency and the geo-political emergency. Adopted by 77,038 votes in an Internet poll, these ten measures are:
 The formation of a constituent assembly tasked with writing the constitution of a Sixth Republic to succeed the present Fifth Republic. Members of the movement consider the Fifth Republic to be a "presidential monarchy", in which too much power is concentrated in the office of the President of the Republic, with the people unable to exercise control over its actions. This constitutional process could also consider alternative forms of legislative elections, such as proportional representation. Constitutional (and therefore institutional) change is considered fundamental by the movement, which sees decreasing electoral turnout as a rejection by French people of their institutional system.
 The repeal of the El Khomri law (labour reform passed in 2016 by the Second Valls government) which the movement believes has ended the "hierarchy of standards" in French labour law by reversing the "principle of favour" and thus not sufficiently protecting workers.
 The "democratic re-founding" of the European Union treaties including changes in monetary policy, common agricultural policy and environmental policy. Failing this, the program envisages a "Plan B" of unilateral exit from European treaties, followed by proposing further cooperation between countries.
 The implementation of an energy transition plan towards a target of 100% renewable energy in 2050, following the studies of the Association négaWatt and the public and interdepartmental Agency of the environment and the control of the energy (ADEME). This transition involves shutting down France's nuclear power plants, criticized by the movement for their dependence on uranium supply, their lack of safety, their radioactive waste management and their financial cost.
 The establishment of a "green rule" not to deprive nature more than can be replenished, nor produce more than it can bear, which the movement would propose during the constituent assembly process for inclusion in the new constitution.
 The right to dismiss elected representatives by recall election when they break campaign promises, or otherwise breach standards. The movement also wishes to propose this measure during the constituent assembly process.
 The protection of common goods such as air, water, food, living, health, energy or currency by preventing their commodification in order to preserve the general interest and by developing corresponding public services.
 The separation of investment and retail banks aimed at separating speculative activities from lend and deposit activities in order to protect the latter and the creation of a public banking center, which would finance small and medium-sized enterprises (SMEs) and carry out credit policy on social and ecological criteria.
 Raising the minimum wage (called "SMIC") from 1,149 to 1,326 euros per month net for 35-hour weeks and raising civil servant salaries frozen since 2010.
 Withdrawal from free trade agreements such as the Transatlantic Trade and Investment Partnership (TTIP) and the Comprehensive Economic and Trade Agreement (CETA).

Other proposals include withdrawing from the North Atlantic Treaty Organization (NATO) to avoid French involvement in wars waged by the United States and thus only to act within the framework of the United Nations (UN); reinforcing the 35-hour work-week and moving towards 32 hours; and reducing the retirement age to 60.

This programme, named L'Avenir en commun (English: "A Shared Future"), was published by the Éditions du Seuil on 1 December 2016. It is based around seven axioms: a Sixth Republic; distribution of wealth; environmental planning; withdrawal from European treaties; peace and independence; human progress; and "on the borders of humanity" (ocean, space and digital). The book rapidly entered the top 10 best-seller list by 9 December, with 110,000 copies printed. It was the subject of an adaptation in digital comic strip, broadcast on the Internet. Thematic booklets, deepening the proposals of the movement, have been published as the campaign progressed.

Candidates for the June 2017 legislative elections are 60% from civil society (have never been members or elected representatives of a political party), with an average age of around 43 years. The invested candidates have signed the charter of the movement as well as the ethical charter of the independent association Anticor, committed to ethics in politics, the fight against corruption and tax noncompliance.

Organisation 
The organisation is not fixed, unlike a classical political party.

Supporters' groups, small committees responsible for promoting Mélenchon's candidacy at a local level, have been established all over France and abroad.

Affiliated parties 

 Rézistans Égalité 974 (on Réunion)
 Left Party
 Ensemble!

Presidential campaign of 2017 
The campaign was directed by Manuel Bompard, national secretary of the PG, its spokesperson was Alexis Corbière, former councillor of Paris and also national secretary of the PG and its coordinators were Charlotte Girard, lecturer in public law at the Paris Nanterre University and Jacques Généreux, lecturer in economy at the Paris Institute of Political Studies.

On 15 November 2016, Jean-Luc Mélenchon held a meeting at Le Manège conference centre in Chambéry. This meeting was attended by 1,100 people, with several hundred more people outside unable to fit into the theatre. Another large meeting took place on 18 March 2017 in Place de la Bastille in Paris. Three of their four last meetings in Marseille, Lille and Toulouse were attended by around 100,000 people.

La France Insoumise was polling at 11.5% a month before the first vote, but Mélenchon received 19.58% in the ballot, finishing fourth and not reaching the final round.

Presidential campaign of 2022 

In January 2022, an initial "People's Primary" voted to select a unity candidate from among seven candidates on the left. Four candidates declined to participate, and Christiane Taubira won, but threw her support behind Mélenchon, who then became the candidate of La France Insoumise for the 2022 French presidential election.

In the first round of voting, Jean-Luc Mélenchon garnered 7.7 million votes, coming in third among twelve candidates with 22% of the vote, behind president Emmanuel Macron in first place with 28%, and narrowly behind Marine Le Pen with 23% of the vote.

Political support 
La France Insoumise is not a coalition of political parties. However, several political parties, branches or individuals announced their support for the movement once its programme had been agreed and its candidate chosen, including the Left Party, the Socialistes insoumis Ensemble!, the French Communist Party, the Pole of Communist Revival in France and some elected officials and leaders of the Europe Ecology – The Greens (EELV). These organizations are not themselves parts of the movement.

Components of the Left Front 
The Left Party, of which Jean-Luc Mélenchon is a member, is the main political force involved in the movement. Several of its executives are organizing the campaign.

The French Communist Party (PCF) is split on support for the movement. The party's national conference rejected a motion of support for Mélenchon by 55% on 5 November 2016, but party members voted three weeks later in favour of support, by 53.6%. Several executive members of the French Communist Party, including president Pierre Laurent and deputy Marie-George Buffet, have endorsed his candidacy.

In November 2016, Ensemble!, the third component of the Left Front coalition, also announced its support for the movement as 72% of its activists had voted in favour. They had been given the choice of three options: to support Mélenchon and work on a common framework (42% of the votes), to participate more directly in the campaign of La France Insoumise (30%) or to reject "at this stage" any support for Mélenchon (25%).

However, the PCF and Together! have chosen to lead "autonomous campaigns", maintaining their independence from the movement. Both parties print leaflets and posters and organize meetings without being associated with the political decisions of the campaign.

Europe Ecology – The Greens dissidents 
In December 2016, the Social Ecology Co-operative, whose members include political figures from Europe Ecology – The Greens (EELV), such as EELV federal councillor Francine Bavay, and Sergio Coronado, member of the National Assembly for French residents overseas, called for the endorsement of Mélenchon's candidacy. In February 2017, Yannick Jadot (the candidate nominated by the EELV Party presidential primary) withdrew in favour of Benoît Hamon (PS) on the basis of an agreement not approved by party members. Some EELV members, including elected representatives, then endorsed La France Insoumise.

On 10 March, 27 environmentalists, including MP Sergio Coronado, activists, local officials, candidates for the June legislative elections, and members of the EELV Federal Council, announced that they would not support Benoît Hamon in the first round of the presidential election, but La France Insoumise instead. They pointed to the fact that Hamon "needs a strong Socialist Party for his campaign" whereas "the hope of an environmentalist left requires instead to get rid of it", criticized François Hollande's five-year term, and suggested that the integration of political ecology into candidates' programs is "recent and inconsistent" for Hamon, while "deep and lasting" for Mélenchon.

On 12 April, seven EELV federal councillors endorsed Mélenchon rather than Hamon. They noted that if Hamon won the presidency and a parliamentary majority, "the majority would be composed of those who have up to the end supported the policies of François Hollande and Manuel Valls", adding: "Who would think that a Socialist Party majority defending Hollande's five-year term would legislate in favour of a radically different social and environmental platform?" On 14 April, Éric Piolle, EELV mayor of Grenoble, also endorsed La France Insoumise.

Election results

Presidential

Legislative 

La France Insoumise does not participate in the Senate elections because of the movement's belief that the upper house is undemocratic and inefficient.

European Parliament

See also 
 2017 French legislative election
 2017 French presidential election
 La France Insoumise group
 Left Front

References 
Notes

References

External links

 
Jean-Luc Mélenchon